Defending gold medalists Serena Williams and Venus Williams of the United States successfully defended their title, beating the Czech Republic's Andrea Hlaváčková and Lucie Hradecká in the final, 6–4, 6–4 to win the gold medal in Women's Doubles tennis at the 2012 Summer Olympics. With the victory, the Williams sisters claimed their third gold medal in doubles and also became the first players in tennis history to win four Olympic golds, with the pairing also winning the doubles gold in 2000 and 2008, and Venus winning the 2000 singles and Serena winning the 2012 singles events. In the bronze medal match, Russia's Maria Kirilenko and Nadia Petrova defeated the United States' Liezel Huber and Lisa Raymond, 4–6, 6–4, 6–1.

The tournament was held from 28 July to 5 August on the grass courts of the All England Lawn Tennis and Croquet Club in Wimbledon, London of the United Kingdom.

All matches were the best of three sets, with tie-breaks used for the first two sets of each match.

Calendar

Seeds 
The top seeded team received a bye into the second round.

Draw

Key

 INV = Tripartite invitation
 IP = ITF place
 Alt = Alternate

 w/o = Walkover
 r = Retired
 d = Defaulted

Finals

Top half

Bottom half

References
Women's Doubles Draw

2012
Tennis at the 2012 Summer Olympics
2012 in women's tennis
Women's events at the 2012 Summer Olympics